Wolfgang Staudinger (born 8 September 1963 in Berchtesgaden, Bavaria) is a West German luger who competed from 1978 to 1989. Together with Thomas Schwab he won the bronze medal in the men's doubles event at the 1988 Winter Olympics in Calgary.

Staudinger also won a bronze medal in the men's doubles event at the 1987 FIL World Luge Championships in Igls, Austria. He also won two gold medals at the 1988 FIL European Luge Championships in Königssee, West Germany (Men's doubles and mixed team). Staudinger won the overall Luge World Cup men's doubles title in 1986-7.

After retiring from luge, Staudinger became a coach in the sport for such lugers as Robert Fegg and Steffen Skel. In June 2007, he was named head coach of the Canadian luge team. Staudinger is married to Marie-Claude Doyon, who finished seventh in the women's singles event at the 1988 games in Calgary.

References

External links
DatabaseOlympics.com information on Schwab
Fuzilogik Sports Winter Olympic results - Men's luge
Hickoksports.com results on Olympic champions in luge and skeleton.
Hickok sports information on World champions in luge and skeleton.
List of men's doubles luge World Cup champions since 1978.
Velocity magazine (Luge.ca) - July 2007

1963 births
Living people
People from Berchtesgaden
Sportspeople from Upper Bavaria
German male lugers
Lugers at the 1984 Winter Olympics
Lugers at the 1988 Winter Olympics
Olympic bronze medalists for West Germany
Olympic medalists in luge
Medalists at the 1988 Winter Olympics
20th-century German people